Duke You may refer to these ancient Chinese rulers:

Duke You of Lu (died 974 BC)
Duke You of Chen (died 832 BC)
Duke You of Jin (died 416 BC)

See also
King You (disambiguation)